Raivis Belohvoščiks (born 21 January 1976) is a Latvian former professional road cyclist who specialized in individual time trial events. He is ten-time Latvian national time trial champion. In 2006 he signed a 2-year contract with UCI ProTour team , but this was not renewed for the 2009 season. He didn't achieve any major results in his first Tour de France. He was 40th in the first time trial around Metz. He was one of the major victims of the Passage du Gois in stage 2, and arrived last in stage 6 to Maubeuge. He left the race during the stage (10) to L'Alpe d'Huez.

Major results 

1995
 1st Liège–Bastogne–Liège U23
1996
 1st Liège–Bastogne–Liège U23
1997
 1st Gran Premio di Poggiana
 4th Overall Tour de Wallonie
1st Stage 5
 5th Time trial, UCI World Under-23 Road Championships
1998
 5th Overall Okolo Slovenska
1999
 1st GP d'Europe (with Marco Pinotti)
 1st Stage 7 (ITT) Deutschland Tour
 3rd Road race, National Road Championships
 4th Time trial, UCI Road World Championships
 5th Firenze–Pistoia
2000
 National Road Championships
1st  Time trial
2nd Road race
 1st Stage 5 (ITT) Tour de Suisse
 2nd Chrono des Herbiers
 2nd GP d'Europe
 5th Overall Vuelta a Murcia
 7th Overall Ronde van Nederland
2001
 National Road Championships
1st  Time trial
3rd Road race
 2nd Overall Tour de Luxembourg
1st Stage 4
 7th Chrono des Herbiers
2002
 National Road Championships
1st  Road race
1st  Time trial
 4th LuK Challenge Chrono
 5th Firenze–Pistoia
 10th Time trial, UCI Road World Championships
2003
 1st  Time trial, National Road Championships
 1st Overall Three Days of De Panne
1st Stage 3b
 4th E3 Prijs Vlaanderen
 6th Gent–Wevelgem
 7th Chrono des Herbiers
2004
 5th Chrono des Herbiers
2005
 1st  Time trial, National Road Championships
 4th Chrono des Herbiers
2006
 1st  Time trial, National Road Championships
 1st Chrono des Herbiers
 1st Stage 6 Tour of Japan
 9th Gran Premio Bruno Beghelli
2007
 1st  Time trial, National Road Championships
 2nd Chrono des Nations
2008
 1st  Time trial, National Road Championships
 1st Stage 7 (ITT) Eneco Tour
 3rd Chrono des Nations
2009
 1st  Time trial, National Road Championships
2010
 1st  Time trial, National Road Championships

Grand Tour general classification results timeline

References
Profile at Saunier Duval-Prodir official website
 

1976 births
Living people
Latvian male cyclists
Sportspeople from Riga
Cyclists at the 2000 Summer Olympics
Cyclists at the 2008 Summer Olympics
Olympic cyclists of Latvia
Tour de Suisse stage winners